Hemicycla is a genus of medium-sized air-breathing land snails, terrestrial pulmonate gastropods in the family Helicidae, the typical snails.

Species
Species within the genus Hemicycla include:
 
 Hemicycla adansoni P.B. Webb & S. Berthelot, 1833
 Hemicycla berkeleii  (R. T. Lowe, 1861)
 Hemicycla bethencourtiana (Shuttleworth, 1852)
 Hemicycla bidentalis (Lamarck, 1822)
 Hemicycla cardiobola (J. Mabille, 1882) †
 Hemicycla collarifera O. Boettger, 1908 †
 Hemicycla consobrina (A. Férussac, 1822)
 † Hemicycla desculpta (Mousson, 1872) 
 Hemicycla diegoi Neiber, R. Vega-Luz, R. Vega-Luz & Koenemann, 2011
 † Hemicycla digna (Mousson, 1872) 
 Hemicycla distensa (Mousson, 1872)
 Hemicycla efferata (Mousson, 1872)
 Hemicycla ethelema (J. Mabille, 1882)
 Hemicycla eurythyra O. Boettger 1908 - endemic to Tenerife
 Hemicycla flavistoma Ibáñez & Alonso, 1991
 Hemicycla fritschi (Mousson, 1872)
 Hemicycla fuenterroquensis Castro, Yanes, Alonso & Ibáñez, 2012
 Hemicycla fulgida Alonso & Ibáñez, 2007
 Hemicycla gaudryi (d'Orbigny, 1839)
 Hemicycla glasiana (Shuttleworth, 1852)
 Hemicycla glyceia (J. Mabille, 1882)
 Hemicycla gomerensis (Morelet, 1864)
 Hemicycla granomalleata (Wollaston, 1878)
 Hemicycla guamartemes (Grasset, 1857)
 Hemicycla hedybia (J. Mabille, 1882)
 Hemicycla idairae Verbinnen & Swinnen, 2014;
 Hemicycla incisogranulata (Mousson, 1872)
 Hemicycla inutilis (Mousson, 1872)
 Hemicycla invernicata (Mousson, 1872)
 Hemicycla laurijona Alonso & Ibáñez, 2007
 Hemicycla mascaensis Alonso & Ibáñez, 1988
 Hemicycla maugeana (Shuttleworth, 1852)
 Hemicycla melchori R. Vega-Luz & R. Vega-Luz, 2008
 † Hemicycla merita (Mousson, 1872) 
 Hemicycla modesta (A. Férussac, 1822)
 † Hemicycla montefortiana Beck & Rähle, 2006 
 † Hemicycla moussoniana (Wollaston, 1878) 
 Hemicycla paeteliana (L. Pfeiffer, 1859)
 Hemicycla paivanopsis (J. Mabille, 1882)
 Hemicycla perraudierei (Grasset, 1857)
 † Hemicycla perrieri (J. Mabille, 1882) 
 Hemicycla planorbella (Lamarck, 1816)
 Hemicycla plicaria (Lamarck, 1816)
 Hemicycla pouchadan Ibáñez & Alonso, 2007
 Hemicycla pouchet (A. Férussac, 1821)
 Hemicycla psathyra (R. T. Lowe, 1861)
 Hemicycla quadricincta (Morelet, 1864)
 Hemicycla saponacea (R. T. Lowe, 1861)
 Hemicycla sarcostoma (Webb & Berthelot, 1833)
 Hemicycla saulcyi (d'Orbigny, 1839)
 † Hemicycla semitecta (Mousson, 1872) 
 Hemicycla vermiplicata (Wollaston, 1878)

References

 Bank, R. A. (2017). Classification of the Recent terrestrial Gastropoda of the World. Last update: July 16th, 2017

External links
 
 Albers, J. C. (1850). Die Heliceen nach natürlicher Verwandtschaft systematisch geordnet. Berlin: Enslin. 262 pp.,

 
Helicidae
Gastropod genera